Garczyn  is a village in the administrative district of Gmina Liniewo, within Kościerzyna County, Pomeranian Voivodeship, in northern Poland.

For details of the history of the region, see History of Pomerania.

As of 2022, the village's population reached 251.

References

Garczyn